Shamsher-ul-Hyderi (10 September 1931 – 10 August 2012) was a Sindhi poet, writer and journalist.

Early life and education
Shamsher-ul-Hyderi was born in the Kadhan town of Badin District, Sindh.
After an early education in his native village, Shamsher-ul-Hyderi briefly attended Sindh Madressatul Islam University in Karachi before graduating with both BA and MA degrees in Sindhi from the University of Sindh in Jamshoro.

Professional career
During his professional career, Shamsher-ul-Hyderi held a variety of jobs. His various employers included: the Pakistan Public Works Department (as clerk), the Cooperative Bank in Badin (as manager), the Sindhi Adabi Board (as clerk, and in 1993 Secretary), Mehran magazine (as assistant editor), Naee Zindagi Monthly magazine (as editor), the National Shipping Corporation (as publishing manager), Daily Mehran newspaper (as editor), and Daily Hilal Pakistan newspaper (as editor).

Literary career
Shamsher-ul-Hyderi's appreciation of literature began with an introduction from his maternal uncle Nazeer Hyderi. He was later guided by the scholars Maulana Ghulam Mohammad Grami and Muhammad Ibrahim Joyo.

Publications
Shamsher-ul-Hyderi mostly composed free verse, and was considered to be a pioneer in free verse poetry.

 Laat (Poetry:1961)
 Insan Kamil (1953)
 Karwan Karbala (1954)
 Poras Ja Hathi (Stories: 1958)
 Tuhinjun Galhiyun Sajan (1961)

Awards
On 10 August 2000, the Government of Pakistan awarded Shamsher-ul-Hyderi with the Pride of Performance award.

Death
Shamsher-ul-Hyderi died of cancer in Karachi on 10 August 2012 at the age of 79.

References

1931 births
2012 deaths
20th-century Pakistani poets
Sindhi-language poets
Sindhi people
Pakistani male poets
20th-century male writers
People from Badin District
Pakistani magazine editors
Pakistani newspaper editors
Recipients of the Pride of Performance
Deaths from cancer in Pakistan